Myrmecina inaequala is a species of ant in the family Formicidae.

References

Further reading

 

Myrmicinae
Articles created by Qbugbot
Insects described in 2009